Wang Zhen is the name of:
Wang Zhen (inventor) (fl. 1290–1333), Yuan dynasty official and inventor of a wooden movable type printing
Wang Zhen (eunuch) (died 1449), Ming dynasty eunuch
Wang Yiting or Wang Zhen (1867–1938), Chinese businessman and painter
Wang Zhen (general) (1908–1993), Chinese general and politician, one of the Eight Elders of the Chinese Communist Party

Sportspeople
Wang Zhen (gymnast) (born 1985), Chinese acrobatic gymnast
Eugene Wang (born 1985), Chinese-born Canadian table tennis player, born Wang Zhen
Wang Zhen (cyclist) (born 1989), Chinese cross-country mountain biker
Wang Zhen (racewalker) (born 1991), Chinese race walking athlete
Wang Zhen (high jumper) (born 2001), Chinese high jumper

See also
 Wang Chen (disambiguation)
 Wang Zheng (disambiguation)